The 2022–23 Coupe de France preliminary rounds, overseas departments and territories make up the qualifying competition to decide which teams from the French Overseas Departments and Territories take part in the main competition from the seventh round.

A total of eleven clubs will qualify from the overseas leagues, two each from Guadeloupe, French Guiana, Martinique, Réunion, and one each from Mayotte, New Caledonia and Tahiti.

In 2021–22, Saint-Denis FC from Réunion and AS Jumeaux de M'zouazia from Mayotte both made it to the round of 64, losing to Jura Sud Foot and Girondins de Bordeaux respectively.

Mayotte
On 13 May 2022, the Mayotte league announced that 78 teams had entered the competition, from Régionale divisions 1 to 4. In the first round, 28 of the Régionale 4 teams would enter, with the other two receiving byes to the second round. By the league's own regulations, the 12 Régionale 1 teams should enter at the third round stage, meaning 20 teams would need to qualify from the second round. The league stated that "this calculation remains difficult" so took the decision to exempt everyone from the second round, leading to 64 teams in the third round (14 first round qualifiers + 12 Régionale 2 teams + 24 Régionale 3 teams + 12 Régionale 1 teams). The third round draw was published on 10 June 2022. The 16ème de Finale, or Round of 32, draw was published on 3 August 2022. The 8ème de Finale, or Round of 16, draw was published on 17 August 2022. The quarter final and semi final draw were made together and published on 31 August 2022.

First round (Mayotte)
These matches were played on 22 and 29 May 2022.

Note: Mayotte League structure (no promotion to French League structure):Régionale 1 (R1)Régionale 2 (R2)Régionale 3 (R3)Régionale 4 (R4)

Third round (Mayotte)
These matches were played on 25 and 26 June 2022.

Note: Mayotte League structure (no promotion to French League structure):Régionale 1 (R1)Régionale 2 (R2)Régionale 3 (R3)Régionale 4 (R4)

Round of 32 (Mayotte)
These matches were played on 13 and 14 August 2022.

Note: Mayotte League structure (no promotion to French League structure):Régionale 1 (R1)Régionale 2 (R2)Régionale 3 (R3)Régionale 4 (R4)

Round of 16 (Mayotte)
These matches were played on 27 August 2022.

Note: Mayotte League structure (no promotion to French League structure):Régionale 1 (R1)Régionale 2 (R2)Régionale 3 (R3)Régionale 4 (R4)

Quarter final (Mayotte)
These matches were played on 10 September 2022.

Note: Mayotte League structure (no promotion to French League structure):Régionale 1 (R1)Régionale 2 (R2)Régionale 3 (R3)Régionale 4 (R4)

Semi final (Mayotte)
These matches were played on 24 September 2022.

Note: Mayotte League structure (no promotion to French League structure):Régionale 1 (R1)Régionale 2 (R2)Régionale 3 (R3)Régionale 4 (R4)

Final (Mayotte)
This match was played on 15 October 2022.

Note: Mayotte League structure (no promotion to French League structure):Régionale 1 (R1)Régionale 2 (R2)Régionale 3 (R3)Régionale 4 (R4)

Réunion
The first of the preliminary rounds in Réunion was drawn on or before 24 May 2022, and saw the entry of 8 clubs from Régional 1 and 12 clubs from Super 2, a newly created second-tier division. 6 clubs from Régional 1 were given byes. Subsequent draws were published only on the league's official Facebook page. The second preliminary round draw, named the fourth round by the league (to align with the main competition) was published on 10 June 2022. The fifth round draw was published on 31 August 2022. The sixth round draw was published on 1 October 2022.

First round (Réunion)
These matches were played on 26, 28 and 29 May 2022.

Note: Reúnion League structure (no promotion to French League structure):Régional 1 (R1)Super 2 (S2)

Fourth round (Réunion)
These matches were played on 17, 18 and 19 June 2022.

Note: Reúnion League structure (no promotion to French League structure):Régional 1 (R1)Super 2 (S2)

Fifth round (Réunion)
These matches were played on 17 and 18 September 2022.

Note: Reúnion League structure (no promotion to French League structure):Régional 1 (R1)Super 2 (S2)

Sixth round (Réunion)
These matches were played on 9 October 2022.

Note: Reúnion League structure (no promotion to French League structure):Régional 1 (R1)Super 2 (S2)

French Guiana
On 5 July 2022, the league published the structure and the draw in full for the qualifying competition, in which 39 teams would compete. To maintain alignment with the mainland competition, qualifying began with the second round, where fourteen teams entered. The remaining 25 teams entered at the third round stage.

Second round (French Guiana)
These matches were played on 20, 27 and 28 August 2022.

Note: French Guiana League structure (no promotion to French League structure):Régional 1 (R1)Régional 2 (R2)

Third round (French Guiana)
These matches were played on 3 and 4 September 2022.

Note: French Guiana League structure (no promotion to French League structure):Régional 1 (R1)Régional 2 (R2)

Fourth round (French Guiana)
These matches were played on 10, 11 and 14 September 2022.

Note: French Guiana League structure (no promotion to French League structure):Régional 1 (R1)Régional 2 (R2)

Fifth round (French Guiana)
These matches were played on 24 September 2022.

Note: French Guiana League structure (no promotion to French League structure):Régional 1 (R1)Régional 2 (R2)

Sixth round (French Guiana)
These matches were played on 8 October 2022.

Note: French Guiana League structure (no promotion to French League structure):Régional 1 (R1)Régional 2 (R2)

Martinique
On 21 July 2022, the league published the draw for the first round of the qualifying competition, at the time labelled 1er Tour, but later referred to as 2e Tour, or second round. The 26 ties in this round, and the 6 byes required to form 16 ties in the next round, made for a total of 58 teams taking part in the qualifying competition.

Subsequent draws were only published on the leagues official Facebook page, usually just before the games took place. The third round draw was published on 1 September 2022. The fourth round draw was published on 14 September 2022. The fifth round draw was published on 4 October 2022. The sixth round draw was published on 17 October 2022.

Second round (Martinique) 
These matches were played on 20, 21 and 23 August 2022.

Note: Martinique League structure (no promotion to French League structure):Régionale 1 (R1)Régionale 2 (R2)Régionale 3 (R3)

Third round (Martinique) 
These matches were played on 2, 3 and 4 September 2022.

Note: Martinique League structure (no promotion to French League structure):Régionale 1 (R1)Régionale 2 (R2)Régionale 3 (R3)

Fourth round (Martinique) 
These matches were played on 14, 16, 17 and 27 September 2022.

Note: Martinique League structure (no promotion to French League structure):Régionale 1 (R1)Régionale 2 (R2)Régionale 3 (R3)

Fifth round (Martinique) 
These matches were played on 4 and 5 October 2022.

Note: Martinique League structure (no promotion to French League structure):Régionale 1 (R1)Régionale 2 (R2)Régionale 3 (R3)

Sixth round (Martinique) 
These matches were played on 18 and 19 October 2022.

Note: Martinique League structure (no promotion to French League structure):Régionale 1 (R1)Régionale 2 (R2)Régionale 3 (R3)

Guadeloupe
On 25 July 2022, the league confirmed that 54 teams had entered from the territory, meaning that the competition would commence at the second round, and a number of teams from Régionale 1 would be exempt to the third round in order to have the correct number of clubs at that stage.

The second round fixtures were published on 19 August 2022, some time after the draw was made, with teams split into two groups. Similarly, the third round fixtures were published on 2 September 2022. The fourth round draw was published on 23 September 2022. The fifth round draw was published on 30 September 2022. The sixth round draw was published on 10 October 2022.

Second round (Guadeloupe)
These matches were played on various dates between 19 and 28 August 2022.

Note: Guadeloupe League structure (no promotion to French League structure):Ligue Régionale 1 (R1)Ligue Régionale 2 (R2)Ligue Régionale 3 (R3)

Third round (Guadeloupe)
These matches were played on 3 and 4 September 2022.

Note: Guadeloupe League structure (no promotion to French League structure):Ligue Régionale 1 (R1)Ligue Régionale 2 (R2)Ligue Régionale 3 (R3)

Fourth round (Guadeloupe)
These matches were played between 23 and 27 September 2022.

Note: Guadeloupe League structure (no promotion to French League structure):Ligue Régionale 1 (R1)Ligue Régionale 2 (R2)Ligue Régionale 3 (R3)

Fifth round (Guadeloupe)
These matches were played on 1 and 2 October 2022.

Note: Guadeloupe League structure (no promotion to French League structure):Ligue Régionale 1 (R1)Ligue Régionale 2 (R2)Ligue Régionale 3 (R3)

Sixth round (Guadeloupe)
These matches were played on 11 and 12 October 2022.

Note: Guadeloupe League structure (no promotion to French League structure):Ligue Régionale 1 (R1)Ligue Régionale 2 (R2)Ligue Régionale 3 (R3)

Saint Pierre and Miquelon
The Overseas Collectivity of Saint Pierre and Miquelon has only three teams, so there is just one match in each of two rounds, with one team receiving a bye to the second round. Lots were drawn to decide which teams would receive the bye. The first round took place on 6 July 2022, and the second round took place on 23 July 2022. The winner gained entry to the third round draw of the Méditerrannée region.

First round (Saint Pierre and Miquelon)
The match was played on 6 July 2022.

Second round (Saint Pierre and Miquelon)
The match was played on 23 July 2022.

References

Preliminary rounds